NA-235 Karachi Korangi-III is a constituency for the National Assembly of Pakistan. The constituency had previously been a stronghold of MQM.

Members of Parliament

2018-2023: NA-241 Karachi Korangi-III

Election 2002 
The Pakistan General elections of 2002 were held in Pakistan on 10 October.
MQM had a tough election run with competition from the coalition of most religious parties named MMA, however the people of NA-254 showed their support by making Nawab Mirza Advocate of MQM victorious by a significant margin. Mirza got 42888 votes as compared to 16733 of runner-up Syed Zahid Siraj.

Election 2008 

General election were supposed to be held on 8 January 2008 but were postponed due to the death of Benazir Bhutto and the PPPP led violence that followed. Elections were eventually held on 18 February 2008.

Dr. Muhammad Ayoub Shaikh of the MQM succeeded in the election 2008 and became the member of National Assembly. He received 132648 votes while the runner-up, Syed Sohail Abrar of the PPPP, could get only 14302 votes.

Election 2013 

General election 2013 was held on May 11 however the elections of this constituency were delayed after ANP's candidate, Sadiq Zaman Khattak, was killed on May 2, 2013 by unknown militants. The Taliban later accepted responsibility for the attack stating that it was a part of the attacks on the secular parties: ANP, PPPP & MQM.

The elections were held on August 22, 2013 under heavy security. The voter turnout was low as generally, the enthusiasm to vote is very low in by elections. Some people complained of not being allowed to vote due to errors in the electoral lists. The election commission announced the results on August 23, 2013 declaring MQM's Muhammad Ali Rashid the winner with 84% of  the votes.

Election 2018 

General elections were held on 25 July 2018.

By-election 2023 
A by-election will be held on 16 March 2023 due to the resignation of Faheem Khan, the previous MNA from this seat.

See also
NA-234 Karachi Korangi-II
NA-236 Karachi East-I

References

External links 
Election result's official website

NA-254
Karachi